The Rogue River is a river in the U.S. state of Michigan, running through Kent and Newaygo counties and through the Rogue River State Game Area.

Its headwaters are a series of ditches that drain the old Rice Lake bed near Grant for agricultural purposes. In this area the stream has been dredged and straightened leaving limited fish habitat. The river joins the Grand River southeast of Belmont in Plainfield Township. The Blythefield Country Club is now situated on a bluff just northeast of where the Rogue flows into the Grand.

Originally named "Rouge River", the river's appellation was altered in the 19th century due to the printing error of a Wisconsin mapmaker.
As a frontier waterway, the historic Rogue River was of major importance to local tribes and traders. During the lumber era in the latter 19th century its waters floated timber to the mills of the Grand River valley, and the riverboat Algoma plied its way northward along Rogue giving its name to the Kent county township of Algoma.

Rogue River is designated as "Country Scenic" under Michigan's Natural Rivers Act. It is popular with trout fishers and local youth who have floated the river by innertube since the mid-20th century. It is intersected in parts by the White Pine Trail.

The Rockford Dam restrains the Rogue in the city of Rockford.

In July 2010, the Rogue River was designated a Trout Unlimited Home River. This provides funding for habitat restoration and land use management planning.

See also
List of Michigan rivers

References

Rivers of Michigan
Rivers of Kent County, Michigan
Rivers of Newaygo County, Michigan
Tributaries of Lake Michigan